Arthur Lester Matthews (6 June 1900 – 5 June 1975) was an English actor. In his career, the handsome Englishman made more than 180 appearances in film and on television. He was erroneously credited in later years as Les Matthews. Matthews played supporting roles in films like The Raven and Werewolf of London (both 1935), but his career deteriorated into bit parts. He died on 5 June 1975, the day before his 75th birthday, in Los Angeles. His ashes were scattered into the Pacific Ocean.

Partial filmography

 The Man at Six (1931) (also known as The Gables Mystery) – Campbell Edwards
 Creeping Shadows (1931) – Brian Nash
 The Old Man (1931) as Keith Keller
 Carmen (1931) – Zuniga
 The Wickham Mystery (1932) – Charles Wickham
 The Indiscretions of Eve (1932) – Ralph
 Fires of Fate (1932) – Lt. Col Egerton
 Her Night Out (1932) – Gerald Vickery
 She Was Only a Village Maiden (1933) – Frampton
 Called Back (1933) – Gilbert Vaughan
 The Melody-Maker (1933) – Tony Borrodaile
 On Secret Service (1933) – Coloneilo Romanelli
 The Stolen Necklace (1933) – Clive Wingate
 The Song You Gave Me (1933) – Max Winter
 The Poisoned Diamond (1933) – John Reader
 Out of the Past (1933) – Captain Leslie Farebrother
 House of Dreams (1933)
 Facing the Music (1933) – Becker
Borrowed Clothes (1934) – Sir Harry Torrent
 Song at Eventide (1934) – Lord Belsize
 Blossom Time (1934) – Schwindt
 Irish Hearts (1934) – Dermot Fitzgerald
 Boomerang (1934) – David Kennedy
 Werewolf of London (1935) – Paul Ames
 The Raven (1935) – Dr. Jerry Halden (Credits) / Dr. Jerry Holden
 Professional Soldier (1935) – Prince Edric
 Song and Dance Man (1936) – C. B. Nelson
 Too Many Parents (1936) – Mark Stewart
 Thank You, Jeeves! (1936) – Elliott Manville
 Tugboat Princess (1936) – 1st Mate Bob
 15 Maiden Lane (1936) – Gilbert Lockhart
 Lloyd's of London (1936) – Captain Hardy
 Crack-Up (1936) – Sidney Grant
 The Prince and the Pauper (1937) – St. John
 Lancer Spy (1937) – Capt. Neville
 There's Always a Woman (1938) – Walter Fraser
 The Adventures of Robin Hood (1938) – Sir Ivor
 Three Loves Has Nancy (1938) – Dr. Alonzo Z. Stewart
 Mysterious Mr. Moto (1938) – Sir Charles Murchison
 Time Out for Murder (1938) – Uncle Phillip Gregory
 If I Were King (1938) – General Saliere
 I Am a Criminal (1938) – District Attorney George Lane
 The Three Musketeers (1939) – Duke of Buckingham
 Should a Girl Marry? (1939) – Dr. White
 Susannah of the Mounties (1939) – Harlan Chambers
 Conspiracy (1939) – Gair – Henchman
 Rulers of the Sea (1939) – Lieut. Roberts
 British Intelligence (1939) – Henry Thompson (uncredited)
 Northwest Passage (1940) – Sam Livermore
 Gaucho Serenade (1940) – Frederick Willoughby
 The Biscuit Eater (1940) – Mr. Ames
 Women in War (1940) – Sir Humphrey, Prosecuting attorney
 The Sea Hawk (1940) – Guard Officer (uncredited)
 Sing, Dance, Plenty Hot (1940) – Scott
 The Lone Wolf Keeps a Date (1940) – Mr. Lee
 Scotland Yard (1941) – Dr. Gilbert (uncredited)
 Man Hunt (1941) – Major
 Life Begins for Andy Hardy (1941) – Mr. Eric J. Maddox (uncredited)
 A Yank in the R.A.F. (1941) – Group Captain
 Son of Fury: The Story of Benjamin Blake (1942) – Prosecutor
 Born to Sing (1942) – Arthur Cartwright
 Sunday Punch (1942) – Smith, Judy's Date (uncredited)
 The Pied Piper (1942) – Mr. Cavanaugh
 Across the Pacific (1942) – Canadian Major
 Manila Calling (1942) – Wayne Ralston
 Desperate Journey (1942) – Wing Commander
 Now, Voyager (1942) – Captain (uncredited)
 London Blackout Murders (1943) – Oliver Madison
 The Mysterious Doctor (1943) – Dr. Frederick Holmes
 Tonight We Raid Calais (1943) – English Maj. West (uncredited)
 Two Tickets to London (1943) – Treathcote (uncredited)
 Appointment in Berlin (1943) – Air Marshal (uncredited)
 Corvette K-225 (1943) – British Captain (uncredited)
 Nine Girls (1944) – Horace Canfield
 Four Jills in a Jeep (1944) – Capt. Lloyd (uncredited)
 The Story of Dr. Wassell (1944) – Dr. Ralph Wayne (uncredited)
 Between Two Worlds (1944) – Steamship Dispatcher (uncredited)
 The Invisible Man's Revenge (1944) – Sir Jasper Herrick
 Shadows in the Night (1944) – Stanley Carter
 Ministry of Fear (1944) – Dr. Norton at Lembridge Asylum (uncredited)
 Jungle Queen (1945) – Commissioner Braham Chatterton
 I Love a Mystery (1945) – Justin Reeves / Mr. G
 Objective, Burma! (1945) – British Maj. Fitzpatrick (uncredited)
 Salty O'Rourke (1945) – Salesman
 Two O'Clock Courage (1945) – Mark Evans
 Son of Lassie (1945) – Major Elliston (uncredited)
 The Beautiful Cheat (1945) – Farley
 Monsieur Verdoux (1947) – Prosecutor (uncredited)
 Bulldog Drummond at Bay (1947) – Shannon Eskdale
 Banjo (1947) – Gerald Warren (uncredited)
 Dark Delusion (1947) – Wyndham Grace
 The Exile (1947) – Robbins
 The Paradine Case (1947) – Police Inspector Ambrose (uncredited)
 Fighting Father Dunne (1948) – Archbishop John Joseph Glennon
 Addio Mimí! (1949) – Fouquet
 The Woman on Pier 13 (1949) – Dr. Dixon (uncredited)
 Free for All (1949) – Mr. Aberson
 Malaya (1949) – Matisson (scenes deleted)
 Montana (1950) – George Forsythe
 Tyrant of the Sea (1950) – Adm. Lord Horatio Nelson
 Rogues of Sherwood Forest (1950) – Alan-a-Dale
 Tales of Robin Hood (1951) – Sir Hugh Fitzwalter
 Lorna Doone (1951) – King Charles II
 Dick Turpin's Ride (1951) – Ridgely – Joyce's Interrogator (uncredited)
 Corky of Gasoline Alley (1951) – Ellis (uncredited)
 The Desert Fox: The Story of Rommel (1951) – British Officer (uncredited)
 Anne of the Indies (1951) – Wherryman (uncredited)
 The Son of Dr. Jekyll (1951) – Sir John Utterson
 5 Fingers (1952) – Undersecretary (uncredited)
 Jungle Jim in the Forbidden Land (1952) – Commissioner Kingston
 The Brigand (1952) – Dr. Lopez
 Lady in the Iron Mask (1952) – Prime Minister Rochard
 Les Misérables (1952) – Mentou Sr. (uncredited)
 Captain Pirate (1952) – Col. Ramsey
 Operation Secret (1952) – Robbins
 Against All Flags (1952) – Sir Cloudsley
 Stars and Stripes Forever (1952) – Mr. Pickering (uncredited)
 Niagara (1953) – Doctor (uncredited)
 Savage Mutiny (1953) – Major Walsh
 Man in the Attic (1953) – Chief Inspector Melville
 Rogue's March (1953) – Brigadier General
 Trouble Along the Way (1953) – Cardinal William Patrick O'Shea
 Jamaica Run (1953) – Judge
 Fort Ti (1953) – Lord Jeffrey Amherst (uncredited)
 The Desert Rats (1953) – Foreign Secretary (uncredited)
 Young Bess (1953) – Sir William Paget
 Sangaree (1953) – Gen. Victor Darby
 Man in the Attic (1953) – Chief Insp. Melville
 Bad for Each Other (1953) – Dr. Homer Gleeson
 Charge of the Lancers (1954) – Gen. Stanhope
 Jungle Man-Eaters (1954) – Comm. Kingston
 King Richard and the Crusaders (1954) – Archbishop of Tyre / Narrator
 Désirée (1954) – Caulaincourt (uncredited)
 Ten Wanted Men (1955) – Adan Stewart
 The Far Horizons (1955) – John Hancock
 The Seven Little Foys (1955) – Father O'Casey (uncredited)
 Moonfleet (1955) – Major Hennishaw 
 Flame of the Islands (1956) – Gus
 Slander (1957) – Frank Grover (uncredited)
 Something of Value (1957) – Game Warden (uncredited)
 The Miracle (1959) – Capt.John Boulting 
 Walk Like a Dragon (1960) – Peter Mott
 Song Without End (1960) – Emissary of the Grand Duchess (uncredited)
 The Young Savages (1961) – Dr. Androtti (uncredited)
 By Love Possessed (1961) – Man at Club (uncredited)
 The Prize (1963) – BBC news Correspondent (uncredited)
 A Global Affair (1964) – British Delegate (uncredited)
 Mary Poppins (1964) – Mr. Tomes (uncredited)
 The Scorpio Letters (1967) – Mr. Harris
 Assault on a Queen (1966) – Doctor 
 Star! (1968) – Lord Chamberlain (uncredited)
Savage Intruder (1970) – Ira Jaffee 
 Baby Needs a New Pair of Shoes (1974) – Mr. McDonald (final film role)

References

External links

1900 births
1975 deaths
English male film actors
Actors from Nottingham
20th-century English male actors
British emigrants to the United States